Kalingga (訶陵 Hēlíng or 闍婆 She-pó / She-bó in Chinese sources) was a 6th-century Indianized kingdom on the north coast of Central Java, Indonesia. It was the earliest Hindu-Buddhist kingdom in Central Java, and together with Kutai, Tarumanagara, Salakanagara, and Kandis are the oldest kingdoms in Indonesian history.

Historiography

The archaeological findings and historical records from this period are scarce, and the exact location of kingdom's capital is unknown. It is thought to be somewhere between present-day Pekalongan or Jepara. A place named Keling subdistrict is found in northern coast of Jepara Regency, however some archaeological findings near Pekalongan and Batang regency shows that Pekalongan was an ancient port, suggests that Pekalongan might be an altered name of Pe-Kaling-an. Kalingga existed between the 6th and 7th centuries, and it was one of the earliest Hindu-Buddhist kingdoms established in Java. The historical record of this kingdom is scarce and vague, and comes mostly from Chinese sources and local traditions.

Kalingga appeared in the 5th century which is thought to be located in the north of Central Java. Information about the Kalingga Kingdom is obtained from inscriptions and records from China. In 752, the Kalingga Kingdom became Sriwijaya's conquered territory because this kingdom was part of a trading network, along with the Dharmasraya and Tarumanagara Kingdoms which Srivijaya had previously conquered. The three kingdoms became strong competitors of the Srivijaya-Buddhist trading network.

History

The Chinese sources come from China and date back to the Tang Dynasty. In book 222 of the New history of the T’ang dynasty (618–906), it is stated that: Ka-ling is also called Djava, it is situated in the southern ocean, at the east of Sumatra and at the west of Bali. At its south it has the sea and towards the north lies Cambodja.

The people make fortifications of wood and even the largest houses are covered with palmleaves. They have couches of ivory and mats of the outer skin of bamboo.

The land produces tortoise-shell, gold and silver, rhinoceros-horns and ivory. The country is very rich; there is a cavern from which salt water bubbles up spontaneously. They make wine of the hanging flowers of the cocoapalm, when they drink of it, they become rapidly drunk. They have letters and are acquainted with astronomy. In eating they do not use spoons or chopsticks.It is stated that the king lives in a town called Djava, Djapa, or Djapo (闍婆). There is also a district called Lang-pi-ya on the mountains, identified by Groeneveldt as Dieng. Groeneveldt argues that Djapa may be referring to Japara, but he does not hold a firm belief in that.

According to the Chinese Buddhist monk Yijing, in 664 a Chinese Buddhist monk named Huining (會寧 Huìníng) had arrived in Heling and stayed there for about three years. During his stay, and with the assistance of Jnanabhadra, a Heling monk, he translated numerous Buddhist Hinayana scriptures.

In 674 the kingdom was ruled by Queen Shima, notorious for her fierce law against thievery, which encouraged her people to be honest and uphold absolute truth. According to tradition, one day a foreign king placed a bag filled with gold on the intersection in Kalingga to test the famed truthful and honesty of Kalingga people. Nobody dared to touch the bag that did not belong to them, until three years later when Shima's son, the crown prince, accidentally touched the bag with his foot. The queen issued a death sentence to her own son, but was over-ruled by a minister that appealed the queen to spare the prince's life. Since it was the prince's foot that touched the bag of gold, so it was the foot that must be punished through mutilation. According to Carita Parahyangan, a book composed in later period, Shima's great-grandson is Sanjaya, who is the king of Sunda Kingdom and Galuh Kingdom, and also the founder of Mataram Kingdom.

Between 742 and 755, the kingdom had moved further east from the Dieng Plateau, perhaps in response to the Buddhist Sailendras.

Inscriptions
The Tukmas inscription was estimated to be originated from Kalingga period. It was discovered on the western slope of Mount Merapi, at Dusun Dakawu, Lebak village, Kecamatan Grabag, Magelang Regency, Central Java, and is written in Pallava script in Sanskrit tells about a clear spring water that is so sacred that adored as the analogue of holy Ganges's source in India. The inscription also bears Hindu signs and imageries, such as trisula, kamandalu (water jar), parashu (axe), kalacengkha (shell), chakra and padma (red lotus), those are symbols of Hindu gods.

Another inscription dated from around the same period is Sojomerto inscription, discovered in Sojomerto village, Kecamatan Reban, Batang Regency, Central Java. It is written in Kavi script in Old Malay language, estimated dated from 7th century. The inscription tell about a ruler named Dapunta Selendra, son of Santanu and Bhadrawati, and husband of Sampula. Indonesian historian Prof. Drs. Boechari suggested that Dapunta Selendra was the ancestor of Sailendras that later rule in Mataram Kingdom.

Both inscriptions suggest that c. 7th century on the northern coast of Central Java, once flourish a Hindu Shivaist kingdom, today identified as Kalingga kingdom. Some oldest Javanese candis are also can be found in mountainous surrounding areas on northern Central Java, such as the Hindu temples of Dieng Plateau, and Gedong Songo temples, but they are probably built in later period, during the early Mataram Kingdom. Historian suggested that there was a link between this old kingdom with later kingdom flourish in Southern Central Java Kedu Plain, the Sailendra of Mataram Kingdom.

References 

Former countries in Indonesian history
History of Central Java
Indianized kingdoms
Precolonial states of Indonesia
Medieval Hindu kingdoms
Hindu Buddhist states in Indonesia
7th century in Indonesia
6th century in Indonesia
Former kingdoms